Cousens is a surname. Notable people with the surname include:

Cecily Cousens (1918–2008), British diver
Don Cousens (1938–2017), Canadian politician
Elizabeth M. Cousens, American diplomat
Ellis Cousens (born 1952), American businessman
Gabriel Cousens (born 1943), American physician, homeopath, and spiritual writer
John Albert Cousens (1874–1937), American Universalist businessman and educator
Lionel Cousens, Australian Paralympic archer
Peter Cousens (born 1955), Australian actor
Peter Cousens (born 1932), South African-born British cricketer